Joseph John Vitko (born February 1, 1970) is a former Major League Baseball pitcher who played for one season. He pitched in three games for the New York Mets during the 1992 New York Mets season.

External links

1970 births
Living people
Major League Baseball pitchers
Baseball players from New Jersey
New York Mets players
Sportspeople from Somerville, New Jersey
St. Francis Terriers baseball players
Binghamton Mets players
Columbia Mets players
Gulf Coast Mets players
Pittsfield Mets players
St. Lucie Mets players

References